Islington JMS is a public elementary school in the historic Islington neighbourhood of Etobicoke, the western district of Toronto, Ontario, Canada. It is part of the Toronto District School Board and is located close to the intersection of Burnhamthorpe Road and Dundas Street West.  Founded in 1832, it is the oldest school in Etobicoke and the second oldest elementary school in Toronto.

References

External links
 School Profile at TDSB

Elementary schools in Toronto
Middle schools in Toronto
Education in Etobicoke